This is a list of people who have served as Lord-Lieutenant of Dumfries.

William Douglas, 4th Duke of Queensberry 17 March 1794 –1797
Charles Montagu-Scott, 4th Duke of Buccleuch 17 November 1797 – 20 April 1819
Charles Douglas, 6th Marquess of Queensberry 8 June 1819 – 3 December 1837
John Douglas, 7th Marquess of Queensberry 8 December 1837 – 1850
Archibald Douglas, 8th Marquess of Queensberry 31 August 1850 – 1858
William Montagu-Douglas-Scott, 6th Duke of Buccleuch 18 March 1858 – 5 November 1914
John Montagu-Douglas-Scott, 7th Duke of Buccleuch 4 January 1915 – 19 October 1935
Francis John Carruthers 29 January 1936 – 22 May 1945
Sir Hugh Gladstone 14 January 1946 – 5 April 1949
Sir John Crabbe 22 July 1949 – 1 November 1961
James Scott-Elliot 27 March 1962 – 1967
Sir Arthur Duncan 27 November 1967 – 1970
Kenneth Murray McCall 14 January 1970 –1973
Sir William Turner 7 January 1973 – 1982
Arthur James Jardine Patterson 5 May 1982 – 10 February 1988
John Gavin Milne Home 16 August 1988 – 1991
Captain Ronald Charles Cunningham-Jardine 16 December 1991 – 2006
Jean Douglas Tulloch 19 August 2006 – 2016
Fiona Kathryne Armstrong (MacGregor) 10 February 2016 –present

References

Dumfries
Dumfriesshire
Dumfries and Galloway